Robert Ivanov (born 19 September 1994) is a Finnish professional footballer who plays for Polish club Warta Poznań and the Finland national team as a centre-back.

Club career
Ivanov has played for FC Myllypuro, FC Viikingit and FC Honka.

He was part of the Veikkausliiga Team of the Month for July 2018, and September 2018.

On 1 September 2020 he signed a two-year contract with Polish club Warta Poznań.

International career
He made his debut for the Finland national football team on 8 January 2019 in a friendly against Sweden, as an 85th-minute substitute for Albin Granlund.

Ivanov was called up for the UEFA Euro 2020 pre-tournament friendly match against Sweden on 29 May 2021.

Personal life 
Ivanov was born in Helsinki to an Ingrian Finnish mother and a Russian father.

References

1994 births
Finnish people of Russian descent
People of Ingrian Finnish descent
Footballers from Helsinki
Living people
Finnish footballers
Finland international footballers
Association football defenders
FC Myllypuro players
FC Viikingit players
FC Honka players
Warta Poznań players
Kakkonen players
Ykkönen players
Veikkausliiga players
Ekstraklasa players
UEFA Euro 2020 players
Finnish expatriate footballers
Finnish expatriate sportspeople in Poland
Expatriate footballers in Poland